The Hotel Canberra, also known as Hyatt Hotel Canberra, is a major hotel in the Australian national capital, Canberra.  It is located in the suburb of Yarralumla, near Lake Burley Griffin and Parliament House.  It was built to house politicians when the Federal Parliament moved to Canberra from Melbourne in 1927.  It was constructed by the contractor John Howie between 1922-1925.  Originally opened in 1924 as Hostel No. 1, in 1927 it became known as the Hotel Canberra.

History

The federal government decided in January 1921 to construct a hostel in Canberra, to accommodate politicians and visitors, in anticipation of the relocation of federal government functions from Melbourne. The hotel was designed by federal architect John Smith Murdoch, and used an unusual (for a hotel) scheme of pavilions arranged around garden courts. The design gave each pavilion better outlook, and could be segregated from other pavilions (while still accessible to hotel services). The building opened on 10 December 1924.

The Hotel Canberra was the first hotel to open in Canberra. It was followed shortly after (in 1926) by the Hotel Kurrajong, located on the other side of the central axis of the Parliamentary Triangle. Once the national capital moved to Canberra, a number of other hotels opened in 1927. The Hotel Canberra was not licensed to serve alcohol until 1928 (which is why it was initially called a "hostel"), owing to Minister for Home Affairs King O'Malley's decision to keep Canberra free of alcohol as it was being constructed.

The Canberra was frequently used as sitting-time accommodation by politicians and, in the early years, as long term accommodation for officials while homes were still being constructed for them. The same was true at the Hotel Kurrajong, with the Kurrajong reputedly favoured by politicians from the Australian Labor Party and the Canberra by politicians from the conservative parties.

When James Scullin became Prime Minister of Australia in 1929, he refused to live in The Lodge, the official residence of the Prime Minister, and he and his wife lived at the Hotel Canberra during parliamentary sessions, and at their home in Melbourne at other times. 

During the Great Depression, economic conditions and the reduction in the number of government employees reduced demand for accommodation in Canberra, and the Canberra and the Kurrajong were the only hotels left open for a time. 

In 1950, the government gave up the management of the hotel and the lease was taken over by "Hotel Canberra Ltd", a subsidiary of Tooheys, a Sydney-based brewery. In 1974 the lease was not renewed and the hotel was shut down. Between 1976 and 1984 it was used as an annexe for Parliament House, providing office space for parliamentary staff.

The hotel was designated as part of the National Estate by the federal government in 1980, shortly before a project began in 1982 to restore the hotel to its former glory and extend it in sympathetic style. After several years of troubles with the backers, Hyatt Hotels re-opened Hotel Canberra on 23 July 1988 as the new Hyatt Hotel Canberra, at the time the only international five-star hotel in Canberra.

On 30 September 1998 , the building was added to the Interim Heritage Places Register of the Australian Capital Territory Heritage Register.

See also

Hyatt Hotels

References

Further reading
Gugler, Ann, (1994). Builders of Canberra 1909-1929.
Gugler, Ann, (1997). Westlake One of the Vanished Suburbs of Canberra.

External links
National Library of Australia - Records of Hotel Canberra
Hyatt Hotel Canberra website

Hotels in the Australian Capital Territory
Buildings and structures in Canberra
Hyatt Hotels and Resorts
John Smith Murdoch buildings
Australian Capital Territory Heritage Register